The 2021 Mnet Asian Music Awards ceremony, also known as 2021 MAMA, organized by CJ E&M and broadcast through its music channel Mnet, took place live on December 11, 2021. The ceremony was held at CJ ENM Contents World in Paju, South Korea. The theme for the ceremony was titled as "Make Some Noise". The ceremony was the 23rd in the show's history.

Background
On July 20, 2021, it was reported by Ilgan Sports the ceremony is undergoing discussion to be held in Hong Kong despite the ongoing pandemic and travel restrictions. On September 7, it was announced the ceremony would be held at CJ ENM Contents World in Paju, South Korea. This will be the second consecutive year, the ceremony will take place in South Korea only.

On October 13, Mnet announced that Lee Hyori will be hosting the ceremony. She will be the first female host for Mnet Asian Music Awards. In addition, Mnet also announced that the theme of the ceremony titled as "Make Some Noise". Mnet also announced that it will be airing a 7-episode special documentary titled "MAMA: The Original K-pop Awards" from October 28, to celebrate the 12th anniversary of the Mnet Asian Music Awards. According to video teaser posted on Mnet's Twitter, the documentary is expected to feature interviews from Psy, Park Jin-young, Exo's Kai, Twice's Nayeon, Sana, and Jihyo, Mamamoo's Hwasa, Stray Kids, Super Junior, Shinee, and 2NE1.

On November 16, a global press conference was held. It was revealed that the awards ceremony will be an offline event with a limited audience in accordance with government disease prevention guidelines. South Korean-based company, Samil PwC, will be auditing the ceremony. Mnet also announced additional performers including British singer-songwriter Ed Sheeran, the 8 crews of Street Woman Fighter, a reunion stage of Wanna One, and a collaboration stage between members of top fourth-generation K-pop groups.

On December 9, Mnet announced the 2021 MAMA Ambassadors. Rain, Song Joong-ki, Ed Sheeran and Han Ye-ri will deliver the key values that made K-content globally loved by global audiences. On December 11, Mnet released a special album titled, "Do the dance", performed by Lee Hyori on music streaming platforms.

Performers 
Ed Sheeran, Street Woman Fighter, and Wanna One were announced as performers on November 16, 2021. The rest of the performers were announced on November 25. On December 5, Kep1er withdrew from the ceremony after a staff member from the group tested positive for COVID-19. Some performances are pre-recorded.

Presenters 
The list of presenters was announced on December 7, 2021. Choi Si-won was originally scheduled as a presenter but was diagnosed with COVID-19 a day before the ceremony.

 Lee Hyun-yi & Ahn Hyun-mo – red carpet hosts
 Lee Sun-bin & Lee Do-hyun – Best New Artists (Male & Female)
 Haha, Monika, & Shin Ga-bee – KTO Breakout Artist
 Kim Seo-hyung – Best Band Performance
 Kim Young-dae & Kim Hye-yoon – Best HipHop & Urban Music
 Yeo Jin-goo – Best Dance Female Group
 Jo Jung-suk – Album of the Year
 Heo Sung-tae & Nam Yoon-su – Best OST
 Jo Bo-ah & Ahn Bo-hyun – Worldwide Fans' Choice Top 10
 Rain & Noh Hong-chul – Worldwide Fans' Choice Top 10
 Han Ye-ri – The value of being different segment
 Lee Jung-jae – Worldwide Icon of the Year
 Song Joong-ki – Breaking the Norm
 Kwon Yul – TikTok Favorite Moment
 Tiffany Young & Choi Soo-young – Best Female Group
 Song Joong-ki – Song of the Year
 Uhm Jung-hwa – Artist of the Year

Criteria

K-pop categories 
All songs that have been released from October 29, 2020, to October 31, 2021, are eligible to be nominated.

Asia Music categories 
Artists from Japan, Greater China, Thailand, Indonesia, and Vietnam who have worked on songs released from October 1, 2020, to September 30, 2021.

Professional categories 
Music experts who participated in the production, creation, activities etc., of K-Pop's records and digital songs released from October 1, 2020, to September 30, 2021.

Winners and nominees

Winners and nominees are listed in alphabetical order. Winners listed first and highlighted in bold.

Online voting for Worldwide Fans' Choice Top 10 opened on the official website and Twitter on November 4, 2021. Online voting for Worldwide Icon of the Year opened on the official MAMA website and Twitter on November 25, 2021. Voting on the official website and Apple Music ended on December 9, 2021, while voting on Twitter ended during the live broadcast.

Main Awards
The list of nominees for all categories excluding TikTok Album of the Year, TikTok Worldwide Icon of the Year, and Best Music Video, were announced on November 3, 2021, through the official website.

Favorite Awards 
The list of nominees for Worldwide Fans' Choice Top 10, were announced on November 3, 2021, through the official website.

Special Awards

Professional Categories

Multiple Awards 
The following artist(s) received three or more awards:

Broadcast 
The ceremony of the 2021 Mnet Asian Music Awards was broadcast live worldwide from Mnet in South Korea, to simulcast across CJ E&M channels; other international networks, and online via Mnet K-pop, Mnet TV, M2, and KCON's YouTube account. The red carpet was broadcast live 2 hours before the main ceremony.

Notes

References

External links
 

Mnet
Mnet
MAMA Awards ceremonies
December 2021 events in South Korea